Looking (Berlin Version) Corona is a live album featuring performances by Cecil Taylor with Harald Kimmig, Muneer Abdul Fataah, William Parker and Tony Oxley recorded in Berlin on November 3 & 4, 1989 and released on the FMP label.

Reception
The Allmusic review by Brian Olewnick states "Recorded a couple of days after the similarly titled solo piano performance also released on FMP, Looking (Berlin Version) Corona is a fine quintet concert, notable for the relatively unusual (for Taylor) instrumental grouping employed... There's an enormous number of recordings from Taylor in the late '80s (much of it on FMP) and, while this may not rank at the very top of even that batch, it's a quite enjoyable release and one that the serious aficionado will want to hear".

Track listing
All compositions by Cecil Taylor.

Recorded at the Total Music Meeting, Quartier Latin, in Berlin, Germany on November 3 (tracks 2 & 3) & 4 (track 1), 1989

Personnel
Cecil Taylor: piano
Harald Kimmig: violin
Muneer Abdul Fataah: cello
William Parker: double bass
Tony Oxley: drums

References

1991 live albums
Cecil Taylor live albums
FMP Records live albums